is a Japanese josei manga artist from Sapporo, Hokkaido, who writes primarily for Kiss and Young You. She won the 1995 Kodansha Manga Award for shōjo for Sekai de Ichiban Yasashii Ongaku.

Notable works
Sekai de Ichiban Yasashii Ongaku (1993-1999)
Nikoniko Nikki (2000-2003)
Pong Pong (2006-2008)
Gin no Spoon (2010-2017)

References

External links 
 Profile at The Ultimate Manga Page

Women manga artists
Manga artists from Hokkaido
People from Sapporo
Winner of Kodansha Manga Award (Shōjo)
Japanese female comics artists
Female comics writers
Living people
20th-century Japanese women writers
21st-century Japanese women writers
Year of birth missing (living people)